Events in the year 1978 in Mauritius.

Governor-General of Mauritius
 Sir Henry Garrioch (1977–1979)

Events
 Dr. Regis Chaperon State Secondary School, Quatre Bornes, established

Births
 20 September - Akash Choolun, Mauritian former international footballer
 6 October - Westley Laboucherie, Mauritian footballer

See also
History of Mauritius

References

 
Years of the 20th century in Mauritius
Mauritius
Mauritius